Asura ocellata is a moth of the family Erebidae. It is found on the Philippines (Luzon).

References

ocellata
Moths of Asia